Bourne may refer to:

Places

UK
 Bourne, Lincolnshire, a town
 Bourne Abbey
 Bourne railway station
 Bourne (electoral division), West Sussex
 Bourne SSSI, Avon, a Site of Special Scientific Interest near Burrington, North Somerset
 Bourne, a hundred in Farnham, Surrey
 Bournes Green, a hamlet in Gloucestershire; also (separately) a suburb of Southend-on-Sea, Essex

US
 Bourne, Massachusetts, a town
 Bourne (CDP), Massachusetts, a census-designated place in the town
 Bourne High School
 Bourne station
 Bourne, Oregon, a ghost town
 Bourne Field, an ex-military airstrip on St. Thomas, US Virgin Islands

Fiction
 Jason Bourne, a fictional character in novels by Robert Ludlum and the film adaptations
 Bourne (novel series), a series of novels originally by Robert Ludlum
 Bourne (film series), a film series based on the novels

Other uses
 Bourne (stream), an intermittent stream, flowing from a spring
 Bourne (surname)
 Bourne baronets
 Bourne Co. Music Publishers, an American music publisher
 Bourne shell, in Unix
 Bourne stone, in Bourne, Massachusetts
 Bourne United Charities, a charitable body in Bourne, Lincolnshire

See also
 Bourne Brook (disambiguation)
 Bourne End (disambiguation)
 Bourne Park (disambiguation)
 River Bourne (disambiguation)
 
 
 Borne (disambiguation)
 Bourn, Cambridgeshire, a village in England